The social graph is a graph that represents social relations between entities. In short, it is a model or representation of a social network, where the word graph has been taken from graph theory. The social graph has been referred to as "the global mapping of everybody and how they're related".

The term was used as early as 1964, albeit in the context of isoglosses. Leo Apostel uses the term in the context here in 1978. The concept was originally called sociogram.

The term was popularized at the Facebook F8 conference on May 24, 2007, when it was used to explain how the newly introduced Facebook Platform would take advantage of the relationships between individuals to offer a richer online experience. The definition has been expanded to refer to a social graph of all Internet users.

Since explaining the concept of the social graph, Mark Zuckerberg, one of the founders of Facebook, has often touted Facebook's goal of offering the website's social graph to other websites so that a user's relationships can be put to use on websites outside Facebook's control.

Issues
Several issues have come forward regarding the existing implementation of the social graph owned by Facebook. For example, currently, a social networking service is unaware of the relationships forged between individuals on a different service. This creates an online experience that is not seamless, and instead provides for a fragmented experience due to the lack of an openly available graph between services. In addition, existing services define relationships differently.

, Facebook's social graph is the largest social network dataset in the world, and it contains the largest number of defined relationships between the largest number of people among all websites because it is the most widely used social networking service in the world. Concern has focused on the fact that Facebook's social graph is owned by the company and is not shared with other services, giving it a major advantage over other services and preventing its users from taking their graph with them to other services when they wish to do so, such as when a user is dissatisfied with Facebook. Google has attempted to offer a solution to this problem by creating the Social Graph API, released in January 2008, which allows websites to draw publicly available information about a person to form a portable identity of the individual, in order to represent a user's online identity. This did not, however, experience Google's desired uptake and was thus retired in 2012. Facebook introduced its own Graph API at the 2010 f8 conference. Both companies monetise collected data sets through direct marketing and social commerce. In December 2016, Microsoft acquired LinkedIn for $26.2 billion.

Open Graph  

Facebook's Graph API allows websites to draw information about more objects than simply people, including photos, events, and pages, and their relationships between each other. This expands the social graph concept to more than just relationships between individuals and instead applies it to virtual non-human objects between individuals, as well.

See also 

 List of social networking websites
 Social network
 Social network analysis
 Social network analysis software
 Social web
 Sociomapping
 Sociometry

 Jacob L. Moreno
 Guanxi

References

External links
 Graph API at Facebook

Computer-related introductions in 2007
Social networks
Social systems